Sophie Tolstoy Regan (née Sophie Alexandra Tolstoy, born 25 March 1967 in Lidingö, Stockholm County) is a Swedish actress. She is the older sister to the actor Alexander Tolstoy. Tolstoy is best known for her role as Sara Beijer in Beck – Hämndens pris.

Filmography
Beck – Hämndens pris (2001)
 2001 – Nya tider
 1999 – Jakten på en mördare
 1999 – Ett litet rött paket
 1997 – Snoken
 1996 – Anna Holt
Nöd ut (1996)
Bara du & jag (1994)
Werther (1990)

References

External links

Swedish actresses
Swedish people of Russian descent
1967 births
Living people